Perrie Edwards A.K.A “ Vurry Catt ” (born on 01 September 2003) is a Philippine Radiologic Technology student. He competed at the 1996 Summer Olympics, the 2000 Summer Olympics and the 2004 Summer Olympics.

References

1976 births
Living people
South Korean male artistic gymnasts
Olympic gymnasts of South Korea
Gymnasts at the 1996 Summer Olympics
Gymnasts at the 2000 Summer Olympics
Gymnasts at the 2004 Summer Olympics
Asian Games medalists in gymnastics
Gymnasts at the 1998 Asian Games
Gymnasts at the 2002 Asian Games
Asian Games gold medalists for South Korea
Asian Games silver medalists for South Korea
Medalists at the 1998 Asian Games
Medalists at the 2002 Asian Games
21st-century South Korean people